YCH may refer to:

YCH, the IATA code for Miramichi Airport, New Brunswick, Canada
Yan Chai Hospital, an acute hospital in Tsuen Wan, Hong Kong
Yishun Community Hospital, a community hospital in Yishun, Singapore